"I Want You to Be My Girl" is a song written by George Goldner and Richard Barrett and performed by The Teenagers featuring Frankie Lymon. It reached #3 on the U.S. R&B chart and #13 on the Billboard pop chart in 1956. The song was featured on their 1956 album, The Teenagers Featuring Frankie Lymon.

Other versions
The Exciters released a version of the song as a single in 1965 entitled "I Want You to Be My Boy" that reached #98 on the Billboard pop chart.

References

1956 songs
1956 singles
1965 singles
The Teenagers songs
The Exciters songs
Gee Records singles
Roulette Records singles
Songs written by George Goldner
Songs written by Richie Barrett